Munyo (Korokoro, Munyo Yaya, Munyoyaya; autonym: afaan munyoti) is a variety of the Oromo language spoken by the Munyoyaya of northeast Tana River County in Kenya. It is similar to the neighbouring Orma language and is regarded as a dialect of Orma by Ethnologue.

References 

Languages of Kenya